The Rochester–Monaca Bridge/Monaca–Rochester Bridge is a steel through continuous truss bridge which crosses the Ohio River between Monaca, Pennsylvania and Rochester, Pennsylvania.  

It opened in 1986 and is the third bridge to occupy the site. It replaced a 1930 steel truss cantilever bridge which itself replaced a suspension bridge built in 1896.

Naming tradition

From 1987 to 2009, the bridge was named each year in honor of the winner of the Rochester vs. Monaca high school football game. In 1988, the Rochester Manager Ed Piroli and Monaca Manager Tom Stoner made a bet signed with a handshake that gave the naming rights of the bridge to the winning team of that year. With Monaca High School's merger into Central Valley High School, the 2009 game was the final game to determine naming rights. By winning the 2009 game, the bridge became known as the Rochester–Monaca Bridge through the end of the 2009 school year. 

Since then it has been called the Rochester–Monaca Bridge on the Rochester side, and the Monaca-Rochester Bridge on the Monaca side.  Both towns' police departments respond to incidents on the bridge, with the incident location on the bridge deciding which town takes charge of incident.

See also
List of crossings of the Ohio River

References

External links

Postcard images of the first two bridges
1930 essay commemorating the suspension bridge
Rochester-Monaca Bridge at Bridges & Tunnels
 

Bridges over the Ohio River
Bridges completed in 1896
Suspension bridges in Pennsylvania
Bridges completed in 1930
Bridges completed in 1986
Continuous truss bridges in the United States
Steel bridges in the United States
Bridges in Beaver County, Pennsylvania
Road bridges in Pennsylvania
1896 establishments in Pennsylvania